Karl Adolf Andritz (13 May 1914 – 19 December 1993) was an Austrian footballer. He played in three matches for the Austria national football team from 1936 to 1937.

References

External links 
 

1914 births
1993 deaths
Austrian footballers
Austria international footballers
Place of birth missing
Association football defenders
FK Austria Wien players